Rakesh Pareek is an Indian politician from the Indian National Congress and a member of the Rajasthan Legislative Assembly representing Masuda Vidhan Sabha constituency of Rajasthan.

References 

1959 births
Living people
Rajasthan MLAs 2018–2023
Indian National Congress politicians from Rajasthan